The Allan Mountain Limestone is a geologic formation in Montana. It preserves fossils dating back to the Carboniferous period.

See also

 List of fossiliferous stratigraphic units in Montana
 Paleontology in Montana

References
 

Limestone formations of the United States
Carboniferous Montana
Carboniferous southern paleotropical deposits